War Zone is a 1998 documentary film about street harassment in the United States, written and directed by Maggie Hadleigh-West.

Synopsis
Hadleigh-West turns her camera on men throughout the United States, asking them why they whistle at or make comments at women who pass them on the street. In response, some men feel compelled to apologize, hit her, yell at her, or engage her in conversation. "Through these conversations, Hadleigh-West reveals the anger, fear and frustration as well as the affection, admiration and humor that characterizes relationships between men and women."

References

External links
War Zone official site

1998 films
American documentary films
German documentary films
1990s English-language films
Films about sexual harassment
1998 documentary films
Documentary films about violence against women
1990s American films
1990s German films